Christian Stock (28 August 1884, Darmstadt, Grand Duchy of Hesse – 13 April 1967 in Seeheim-Jugenheim) was a German Social Democrat politician and the first Prime Minister—Ministerpräsident—of the provisional state of Greater Hesse (later Hesse), which had been constituted in the aftermath of World War II.

Stock was over 82 at the time of his death, making him the oldest Minister-President that the Republic had had until then.

External links 
 

1884 births
1967 deaths
Politicians from Darmstadt
People from the Grand Duchy of Hesse
Social Democratic Party of Germany politicians
Members of the Weimar National Assembly
Grand Crosses 1st class of the Order of Merit of the Federal Republic of Germany
Ministers-President of Hesse